Fry Peak is a sharp-pointed peak which is the southernmost peak in the Welch Mountains, in Palmer Land, Antarctica. It was mapped by the United States Geological Survey in 1974, and was named by the Advisory Committee on Antarctic Names for Lieutenant Frederick M. Fry, U.S. Navy, a Flight Surgeon and member of the para-rescue team of U.S. Navy Squadron VXE-6 during Operation Deep Freeze 1969 and 1970.

References

Mountains of Palmer Land